Turns into Stone is a compilation album by English rock band The Stone Roses, released in 1992. It consists of early singles and B-sides that did not feature on their self-titled debut album. The compilation reached number 32 on the UK album chart.

The album's release was surrounded by controversy, as the Roses were in the middle of a legal battle with their then-record label, Silvertone. An injunction prevented the band from releasing any new material for several years afterward, during which Silvertone re-released many singles, including two separate versions of "Fools Gold", and releasing stand-alone singles from the first album that were not intended to be singles (such as the edited version of "I Am the Resurrection" featuring a drum machine instead of Reni's distinctive drumming).

Despite this, the album is seen in a positive light by Roses fans because it collects the extended versions of many of their best-known non-album songs onto one CD, before a best-of compilation was even available.

The title of the album is taken from the final lines of One Love: "What goes up must come down/Turns into dust or turns into stone".

In August 2009 the album's tracks were remastered by John Leckie and included as "The B-sides" on the 20th anniversary collectors edition re-release of The Stone Roses self-titled debut album and the remastered album went on to be released separately in September 2012 by Sony Music.

Track listing
 "Elephant Stone" (12" version) – 4:53
 "The Hardest Thing in the World"  – 2:39
 "Going Down"  – 2:46
 "Mersey Paradise"  – 2:44
 "Standing Here"  – 5:05
 "Where Angels Play"  – 4:15
 "Simone"  – 4:24
 "Fools Gold"  (12" version) – 9:53
 "What the World Is Waiting For"  – 3:55
 "One Love" (12" version) – 7:45
 "Something's Burning" – 7:50

Catalogue Numbers
 LP: Silvertone ORE LP521
 LP: Music On Vinyl MOVLP628 (180g Remaster)
 LP: Modern Classics Recordings MCR 915 (2 x 180g Remaster)
 CD: Silvertone ORE CD521
 CD: Silvertone Records / Sony Music 88725467042 (2012 Remaster)
 Cassette: Silvertone ORE C521

References

External links

Turns into Stone at YouTube (streamed copy where licensed)

1992 compilation albums
The Stone Roses albums
Albums produced by John Leckie